Nikolay Stanchev (born ) is a Bulgarian male track cyclist, representing Bulgaria at international competitions. He competed at the 2016 UEC European Track Championships in the team sprint event.

References

1980 births
Living people
Bulgarian male cyclists
Bulgarian track cyclists
Place of birth missing (living people)